Kalenda (or Calenda) may refer to:

Kalenda (martial art), or Calinda, a martial art and associated dance form of the Caribbean
Kalenda (festival), an ancient pagan festival originated by Adam, according to Jewish rabbinic literature
Calends, or Kalendae, Kalenda, Kalendas, the first days of the month in the ancient Roman calendar
Kalenda Proclamation, or Kalenda, a Catholic liturgy preceding mass on Christmas Eve
Koliada

People
Česlovas Kalenda, a Lithuanian philosopher
Dmitri Kalenda, Estonian ice hockey player for Tallinna HK Stars
Jean Kalenda, soccer player for Birmingham City F.C. Reserves and Academy
Carlo Calenda, an Italian business executive and politician

See also
Calinda (disambiguation)
Kalinda (disambiguation)